Lee In-Jong (Hangul: 이인종, born August 2, 1982) is a South Korean female taekwondo practitioner. She is a three-time World Championship middleweight silver medalist.

Lee did not qualify for the 2008 Olympics losing to Hwang Kyung-Seon, who eventually won the Olympic gold medal in the women's under 67 kg division in Beijing, in the South Korean National Trials.

As a middleweight (under 73 kg), Lee clinched her slot in the women's over 67 kg division 2012 Olympic South Korean National Trials where she beat 2011 World Championship runner-up An Sae-Bom and 2007 World Championship runner-up Park Hye-Mi.  At the Olympics, she lost in her bronze medal bout to Anastasia Baryshnikova.

References

External links
 
 

Living people
South Korean female taekwondo practitioners
1982 births
Taekwondo practitioners at the 2012 Summer Olympics
Olympic taekwondo practitioners of South Korea
Asian Games medalists in taekwondo
Taekwondo practitioners at the 2006 Asian Games
Asian Games bronze medalists for South Korea
Medalists at the 2006 Asian Games
World Taekwondo Championships medalists
Asian Taekwondo Championships medalists
21st-century South Korean women